Throughout the years, Children's BBC, and later CBBC and CBeebies, have used a number of different identities. The branding of the stranded service is distinctive both in the past and at present.

Pre Children's BBC
Prior to the launch of Children's BBC on 9 September 1985, BBC1 used some specialist branding for its children's strand. The origins of CBBC can be found in the "Children's Hour" of the original BBC Television Service, but prior to 1984, children's programmes received no special idents and continuity was done out of vision by the duty continuity announcer. However, between programmes, some special branding was put in use to reflect better the audience they were serving.

In the 1970s, the programme caption was changed to a blue and yellow variation featuring the faces of a boy and girl, with references to other programmes: Zebedee from The Magic Roundabout, the title character of Scooby-Doo, and title cards and logos from Play School and Blue Peter. The slide was in fact coloured by the NODD system used to produce the globe at the time. The slide was later changed in 1981 to a group of children staring at the caption in excitement, following the change of globe. Promotions now featured slides of balloons, with the programme name in the centre, and occasionally accompanied by the official static captions.

Just prior to the launch of Children's BBC, a BBC Micro B 3D Collage was introduced to generate computer generated stings for the children's strand. Such animations were used to introduce programmes, such as a spider spinning down onto a detonator triggering the words Hello from BBC1, and to link into promotions for further programmes, such as a group of sky divers falling from a plane to spell out a 'Later' caption. However, despite the graphics, programmes were still directly introduced by the BBC1 globe symbol, albeit occasionally accompanied by a choice of two different 14-note synthesized tunes.

Children's BBC

Original Logo
The first ident for Children's BBC once again made use of the BBC Micro B computer. The design featured the word 'Children's' on top of a large sprawled 'BBC' made up of the three colours red, green and blue. In ident, each letter of the BBC animated in to the four note electronic soundtrack, with the Children's scrolling across afterwards. It originally had a blue background, but this was changed to black after a few months. The letters were also all turned yellow in autumn 1986, and were set against a white background whenever programmes were broadcast on BBC2.

From the launch of the branding, live in-vision continuity was generally broadcast by a dedicated team of presenters from a small self-op Presentation studio within the BBC1 network control area at Television Centre. The presenter would talk, interact with other characters, and view children’s pictures and letters, many of which would end up on the dressed back wall of the booth. They would also operate sound and vision mixers to partially direct their own links, although overall responsibility for transmission belonged to duty transmission staff in the adjacent network control room (NC1).

For times when Children's BBC aired on BBC2, the presenter would appear in-vision from the network's self-op continuity studio, although this was not usually dressed with set branding and remained plain. A running joke would develop where the duty presenter (i.e. Phillip Schofield) would present their links in a dinner jacket because BBC2 was considered more highbrow. Promotions were of no particular style, with the promotion usually voiced by the duty presenter and featuring only the programme name and title at the bottom of the screen.

In 1987, the BBC Micro ident was replaced by one created using stop motion animation. In this ident, each of the letters of the word 'Children's' was allocated an image beginning with that letter. These images - a car, a horse, an ice cream, a lighthouse, a duck, a rocket, an elephant, a number nine, and a ship - would all be drawn on screen by yellow wispy lines, which after drawing all the animals would animate out to draw the 'BBC' caption. This ident was played out from tape, as opposed to the live BBC Micro ident. These pictures also appeared on other Children's BBC items, such as stationery: letters sent from the Children's BBC office to children would have these images superimposed upon the background of the document.

During this time, the presenters began to devise new ways of filling the time slots, with competitions and features taking precedence. Alongside these new additions, changes were being made to BBC Presentation, and the Broom Cupboard itself. In 1989, the continuity booth was equipped with NICAM digital stereo, and as a result, Children's BBC presentation was moved temporarily to a smaller studio, nicknamed the 'Boiler Room'. This was based in a reserve network control area (NC3) generally used between the two networks during maintenance or engineering work, from where the Broom Cupboard nickname had originated.

On 8 January 1990, the new ident was generated live on air by an Acorn Archimedes computer. The new ident featured a glossy, gold version of the familiar stylised BBC text, with pale green text for the 'Children's' caption and a dark green background superimposed with small stylised CBBC's in the same font as the main 'BBC' section of the logo. The ident formed up through the use of zig-zag lines and concentric circles, which continued to move around and between the letters.

Corporate Logo
On 16 February 1991, BBC1 and 2 both relaunched with corporate branding packages based on a Virtual Globe and the antics of a numeral 2. Both packages had a similar promotional design and both featured a large numeral above a BBC logo at the bottom of the screen. As part of this relaunch, Children's BBC also received its own symbol based on this design. It was implemented at the beginning of the academic year on 9 September 1991. The new symbol took the emphasis away from the 'BBC' and placed it firmly with the 'Children's' part of the name. This new logo featured a large neon style letter replacing every other letter in the 'Children's' name, with the exception of 'D' which had a neon strip curve around the letter. This appeared against a dark background of an assortment of colours and accompanied by an upbeat soundtrack accompanied in some versions by a voice saying phrases such as "Tell that aardvark it's a wrap" and "Essential viewing coming up". The original electronic beat music was seen as too slow and dull originally, and so was replaced soon after with a more bombastic tune.

Accompanied with the new look, the Broom Cupboard received a makeover with new neon signage matching the new logo as well as the presenters name in a similar style to the logo. In addition to this, Children's BBC also received a corporate styling for promotions, slides, and menus. Promotions were kept the same as the channel they were broadcast on, however the menu and slide design was unique. The slide design, in line with BBC1 and 2, featured a sidebar down the left hand side of the screen, with the channel logo located in the top left hand corner of the screen, above a BBC corporate logo. The Children's BBC slides however, also had the Children's BBC logo inserted sideways into the sidebar, and images from the ident featured as the background to programme menus. These slides and menus were used prior to a start-up into Children's BBC, and for promotional use outside of Children's BBC itself, for example after the morning strand was completed.

BBC Scotland had their version of the 1991 - 1994 ident which was the same as the network version but with the Scotland branding incorporated into the ident. These were used in the school holidays from the launch of Children's BBC Scotland in July 1991 - July 1994.

This logo remained with Children's BBC until 1997, however the ident itself changed within half that time. In 1994, Children's BBC moved out of the soon-to-be-decommissioned network control area, bringing an end to the Broom Cupboard era, and into the larger Pres A studio which had been used for birthday slots, weekend, and holiday strands. To mark the move, CBBC, as it was becoming increasingly known informally by the presenters, commissioned a new ident. Launched on 5 September 1994, the logo remained, however was rendered in 3D and set at a slight angle and formed in chunks. This was accompanied by a 3D BBC logo located in the bottom right corner of the screen, and set against a moving rainbow coloured background with bits of black on it. This was later replaced in 1996 by a version on a moving yellow background, with a 2D grey BBC logo.

Throughout this era, a variety of logos were produced by BBC Manchester's Graphic design department for use, that featured computer-generated animations or cartoons and would include the Children's BBC logo in it somewhere, either as a whole or in part, and often accompanied by the BBC logo. These later logos and idents include:
Alien - A farmers field is shown, with an alien spaceship hovering above and a scarecrow standing in the fields. The scarecrow turns around to reveal an alien in its place, and the shot pans out to the field with 'Children's' inscribed in it, and the BBC logo on the spaceship.
Bee - A bumble bee encounters a venus fly trap, which it then swallows, before turning into the black and yellow BBC logo and the 'Children's' letters falling from above.
Boy - Letters from the 'Children's' jump out from a boy's face in various orders, and when he opens his mouth, the 'Children's' can be seen on his uvula, dangling from the roof of his mouth, with the BBC logo on his tongue.
Christmas Rooftop - on a winter's night (with the flashing grey 'Children's' logo in the dark). Father Christmas twists a few times in a chimney (with the 'Children's' logo on the sack next to the chimney.) and brings up high into the sky, the reindeer stands in the chimney a few seconds and then Father Christmas crashes back into the chimney and the BBC logo appears on the grey paving slabs on the roof after the snow slides off the roof and the reindeer has a couple of giggles on the rooftop.
Christmas Sleigh - Father Christmas pulls his goggles for flighting a sleigh with seven reindeers. The 'Children's' logo appears in the sky, with the BBC logo fading in.
Christmas Tumble - Father Christmas strolls along in the snow and then brings out of sight when letters of the 'Children's' logo (and a couple of presents) fly in all directions, then Father Christmas gasps when he sees the 'Children's' logo electrocuting on the reindeer's antlers while the reindeer hold the BBC logo between his teeth.
Cow - Four cows are seen standing on small balls of grass, the last of which blows a bubble, containing the 'Children's' logo, with the BBC logo contained in three flowers.
Egyptian - In Egypt, a mummy walks past where the lizard sits on the coffin, a lid opens and bandage comes undone one by one the letters of the 'Children's' inside and a lizard dances an Egyptian dance.
Frankenstein - A sad monster looks out of the window, Thunder rumbles and lightning crackles as the machine contains the 'Children's' logo, The monster cheers himself up by pulling every lever of the machine whilst electrocuting himself.
Genie - Aladdin walks inside the cave until he spots a magic lamp, he rubs the lamp and the 'Children's' logo comes out and Aladdin jumps up and down with glee.
Jazz - The Children's BBC logo is seen split vertically, and stretched directions, against a plain blue background and a jazzy version of the soundtrack.
Mechanical Dogs - Metal, mechanical dogs bark at letters of the 'Children's' raised on metal stilts above them, which come together to form the logo. The BBC logo is on one of the dogs.
Noddy - On the same moving rainbow coloured background with bits of black from the main Children's BBC ident from 1994–1996, Noddy (from the Noddy's Toyland Adventures TV series) walks into view with the BBC logo on a piece of card in his hands under the "Children's" logo. He stops and smiles at the camera for a quick second, then finally walks a quick pace to stop in the middle of the screen to wave at the camera. before finally taking a bow.
Oakie Doke - A ident featuring the titular character of the children's TV series Oakie Doke.
Otis the Aardvark Paint - A cartoon version of Children's BBC puppet Otis the Aardvark paints a picture and the logo is in the middle of the painting.
Otis the Aardvark Toffee - A cartoon version of Children's BBC puppet Otis the Aardvark eats toffees out of a tin and gets his nose caught in the tin. The CBBC logo is on the bottom of the tin.
Pig - A live piglet roams around an area with numerous 'Children's' imposed on the floor, and just as many BBC logos imposed on the back wall. Various shots of the pig end with the Children's BBC logo on the pig's rear.
Pingu -  A 2D version of Pingu finishes building a snow park with a snowman in the middle (and the striped Children's letters on the top of the banderole with some snow at the top). The snowman gasps, then sneezes. Pingu comes out of the D and looks up at the sky giggling. A 3-D grey-and-black 1988–1997 BBC logo falls from above.
Princess & Frog - A princess kisses a frog, turning her into a variety of objects including a cow and a pair of pants, before becoming a frog. Another kiss turns both into the Children's BBC logo before the changes continue.
Sculptor - A man in a toga sculpts a block of stone with the BBC logo carved into it. However he hits too hard, resulting in the stone crumbling away to reveal the 'Children's'. Then, the man then himself crumbles into a delighted child.
Singing Duck and Fish - A duck and a fish sing a short jingle about Children's BBC, while the other holds up the words. The Children's BBC logo appears on the back wall.
Space - A spaceship flies round planets, before crashing into a moon, leaving the Children's BBC logo to circle to wreckage.
Surfboard - A man surfs on a board, before falling off, sending a large wave into shore, which washes up the Children's BBC logo.
Teen's Bedroom - A teenager struggles out of a messy bedroom into the hall. While he is gone, the numerous letters of the logo, the 1988–1997 BBC logo, and the logo of the channel it is on all appear in different locations around the room. The same thing is repeated when he staggers back in, but with the 1991–1997 BBC1 "1" logo and the 1991–2007 BBC2 "2" logo.
Underwater - A diver appears inside a fishbowl, only to reveal the bowl is underwater, inhabited by an Elvis fish.
William's Wish Wellingtons - A ident featuring William from the children's TV series William's Wish Wellingtons.
In addition to these, some were used for certain programmes, such as Saturday Aardvark, which used bubbles with letters of the 'Children's' on them, and the Breakfast show. Originally this utilised a personalised TV screen with a CBBC ident displaying in the viewer but was later replaced by a cereal box that poured out Children's BBC logos, BBC logos and logos from some of the programmes. BBC Scotland also had their versions of the Children's BBC idents which were the same as the network versions but with the Scotland branding incorporated into the ident. These were used on weekday mornings in the school holidays from October 1994 - July 1997. The 1991 - 1994 ident, along with its accompanying Broom Cupboard theming, was re-used on 9 September 2015 as part of the anniversary special Hacker's Birthday Bash: 30 Years of Children's BBC.

CBBC

Yellow animations

On 4 October 1997, the new BBC logo was launched by the corporation, and all of the BBC's channels and services received a makeover. CBBC was no different, with a new logo and idents package to match a newly refurbished set for TC9. The new logo was seen everywhere on every channel in near identical design, so that the BBC's output was centralised, and as a result CBBC's logo featured a 'C' added in front of the BBC blocks logo, with the name of the service added after, be it CBBC One, CBBC Two, CBBC Scotland, CBBC on Nickelodeon and CBBC Choice. Whereas before, CBBC tried to portray the end of one service, and the beginning of another, this look made it feel like CBBC was taking over that service.

The new idents all featured a yellow and black colour scheme and featured a two-dimensional animation based around a surreal concept, an interesting design, or an adventure scene. Promotions for the service featured the same promotional style as the other services, with the CBBC logo at the bottom and the programme and channel details centred at the bottom for widescreen, which came later in early 2002. Also getting a makeover was the set in TC9. Again following the yellow and black theme, notable parts include large CBBC logos extending upright the columns, a large video wall made up of 12 televisions, and a desktop computer used to promote the CBBC website.

Blobs - Black blobs, similar to those found in a lava lamp object, are seen rising up the screen.
Cat and Bird - A bird pecks around in seeds and crumbs before finding a worm stuck down a hole. Pulling the worm free, the bird finds out it is a cat's tail, who promptly chases after the bird.
Cat and Mouse - The cat chases a mouse into its hole and lies in wait. The mouse emerges disguised under a leaf. The cat, impatient, sticks his head in the hole, allowing the mouse to get away.
Dragon - A dragon scrambles up on to a rock, prepares to take flight, only to fall down to the bottom.
Fish - A shoal of five fish swim across the screen, turn so they are only seen as thin lines emitting bubbles, before turning back across the screen. A longer version of this ident was produced.
Frog - A frog, sat on a lily pad, spots a fly above him, sticks his tongue out to catch the fly, only to be pulled off into the air.
Magician - A magician performs the act of pulling his own shirt off, as he attempts to pull something from his top hat (which unfortunately doesn't appear to be a rabbit at all), much to his embarrassment.
Man and Dog - A man walks his fluffy dog on a lead. The dog, however, gets caught on a rock and unravels into a single line, much to the owner's bemusement.
Mole - A mole digging a tunnel comes to the surface to clear his glasses, before continuing on.
Mouse - A mouse (out of breath) arrives on screen and comes up with the idea to take his ears off for wheels, his tail for handlebars and his nose for a seat, becoming a bicycle, then cycles quickly off the screen, the rest of his body looking like a bike racer. A still from this ident was used when they had technical difficulties at the time.
Octopus - An octopus swims into view, spots the viewer, and hides in his own ink, allowing him to get away.
Skunk - A skunk grabs a can of deodorant and sprays it on him. He is soon disgusted by the smell and throws the can into a bin where many of cans are.
Snail - A snail moves on, checks nobody is looking, and quickly scratches his back by lifting his shell off.
Space Girl - A girl flying a spaceship in the Japanese Manga style.
Spiral - Various swirls, spirals, and circles all moving towards the screen.
Tiger - A tiger stalks and hides in a jungle environment, and surprises the camera.

In addition to these idents, there was also idents for the programmes Saturday Aardvark and the CBBC Breakfast Show. BBC Scotland also had their versions of the CBBC idents which were the same as the network versions but with the Scotland branding incorporated into the ident. They were only used in the summer holidays from July 1998 until July 2000. Special idents were commissioned for Christmas, from 1997-1999 they consisted of a periscope type animation, with festive images appearing, and from 2000-2001 they were various idents with a small penguin and a snowman in various scenarios, and in summer, when the 'CBBC HOT' name was used. An animation was also introduced for the end copyright, originally a coin spinning and falling over before turning into a thick line, this later became numerous signs moving towards the viewer in mid-1999-2002. On Monday 3 September 2001, CBBC switched to widescreen and as a result, the branding was altered. Some idents were withdrawn entirely, while the rest were sped up or mixed in with others to form montages that were used instead. The music was also changed, with two versions now used: for CBBC's older viewers (a fast-paced techno music) and for CBBC's younger viewers (a kid-friendly upbeat music), in what would soon be called CBeebies. Additionally, the idents for preschool programming had clips from Tweenies mixed in.

Special idents were made for CBBC on Choice before they started using the regular ones from 1998-2000. They were based on the first set of BBC Choice idents from 1998 consisting of three items with similar names, like boxer shorts, boxing gloves, and a boxer dog.

The CBBC Bugs

On 11 February 2002, CBBC changed dramatically in both look and remit. The day marked the launch of the CBBC Channel, resulting in a new platform for the well-known brand. Also launched at the same time was the CBeebies channel and strand, resulting in CBBC's remit changing from 6–12 years of age, to 8–12 years. To mark both, a new identity was created for both to mark the occasion. Designed by Lambie-Nairn, the bug idents featured green moving bugs that contained the BBC logo as well as purple, textured 'C'. The bugs could split into others, and would often be depicted either fighting amongst themselves, or as being split or separated multiple times. In the last few weeks of the 'Yellow Animations' ident package before the day of the rebrand, the bugs occasionally invaded its ident package and presentation, but at the same time, they also occasionally invaded the BBC One idents and presentation, which teased and confused viewers into the upcoming new look. On 1 January 2004, the bugs have their own home in the idents, which was a lava lamp background containing with a purple building used for the CBBC Channel and a pink building used for CBBC's morning and afternoon strands on BBC One and Two. In-vision was still used, with TC9 being used for links on BBC One and Two, and the CBBC channel using TC2, however the set was changed to vivid backgrounds with blob shapes on, often with the idents playing in the background. Promotions also changed so branding only occurred at the end, at which a wavy blue banner at the bottom would flow it with programme details on, usually with a blob looking in from the side of the screen. The new channel also had a DOG featuring the BBC logo, with a blob containing the 'C' only in front. The DOG was not used on terrestrial links, although a clock was occasionally added for morning links, either on its own or located inside a static blob.

The bugs themselves were closely related to those designed for CBeebies, and almost identical for those designed for the Canadian television station, owned by BBC Worldwide, BBC Kids, which used yellow and blue for the bugs instead of green and purple. This branding launched on 5 November 2001, 3 months before CBBC and CBeebies, and would remain until 2011.

CBBC's "green gumdrop"

The traditional bugs look lasted until 30 September 2005, when the blob concept was redesigned towards the start of October. A single blob (which resembles a gumdrop) was now used: it featured a larger and plainer 'C' letter and was turned into a three-dimensional object, which would zoom around a screen often accompanied by a ball from which many arrows could point and some crystal lines were flying about. The idents also featured the CBBC stars in the purple background with various floating objects (such as the cash registers for Kerching!, the spiked heart balloons for Tracy Beaker or the flying birds for Raven), before the background turns over to reveal the CBBC logo at the end of each ident. This style was changed so that the end screen changed to a single shot of the bug with the programme name below, and the DOG was also updated. In-vision for the channel continued to be used, however, it was used less and less: CBBC moved out of TC9 in December 2006 to TC12, where the presenter would just stand in front of a bluescreen while only a fixed camera is used.

Stylised CBBC

CBBC relaunched again on Monday 3 September 2007, with a new logo revolving around the letters of CBBC, each in a different style. A new set of idents followed these up, revolving around scenes including each of the 4 stylised letters before coming together at the end. These scenes could involve cartoon figures (including the animated CBBC programmes like Shaun the Sheep and one of the animated segments from Tracy Beaker, as well as the online game Adventure Rock), or stars of current CBBC programmes (which were Barney Harwood, Basil Brush, James Mackenzie, Daniel Anthony, Dani Harmer, Ed Petrie, Oucho T. Cactus, Mark Speight, Kirsten O'Brien, Richard Hammond, Sam Nixon, Mark Rhodes, Caroline Flack, Gethin Jones, Ayo Akinwolere, Zöe Salmon, Bel Powley, Moustafa Palazli, and Rachel Petladwala in the idents). Numerous different styles were made involving the different scenes, and were added regularly to reflect programmes in March and October 2008 with two more being released in early 2009 relating to the third series of M.I. High and new series Richard Hammond's Blast Lab. Children could also make their own versions, the so-called Mash Up, on the CBBC website, and indeed some of these were added to the main set. At the end of this sequence, a two-dimensional cartoon style endboard was added that contained the CBBC logo animating into place, against a white background with the green zig-zag lines of the look animating around the edge of the screen. This was altered on 10 September 2010, when the CBBC logo was given a 3D glossy look, and as a result the end boards were changed to a fully formed CBBC logo moving around on the green bars on the screen. In 2013, they added new variations of the idents which mixed up a few idents, or at least changed one thing about it.

Accompanying these idents at the end of the CBBC strand or Channel, were two cartoon characters. These, in the form of a dancing fox and a hairy monster, would point out additional CBBC services. This would normally consist of pointing out the CBBC website and, if currently broadcasting, the CBBC channel. Promotions consisted of the video with the CBBC logo, programme title, and times appearing at the end on the green zig-zag lines that accompanied the channel. This was altered in 2010, so the video would shrink into a box contained within the white and green lines where the CBBC logo now originated at the end of the idents. The programme title would now be overlaid the white background, rather than be incorporated into the design. The DOG for the CBBC channel was also changed to the new logo, however it retained its green colour scheme, and would often animate, with the letters popping out and in at regular intervals.

The new look was created by the Children's BBC marketing team, with Red Bee Media designing the new logo and idents, and Fallon, who created the new TV trails that were used prior to launch.

2014 Ident Update
On 13 September 2014, CBBC introduced a new set of idents after seven years, whilst retaining the existing logo. The new idents featured various animated scenes containing references to the programming, like the previous look from 2007 to 2014.

Just Imagine

On 14 March 2016, CBBC rebranded with a new logo that was similar to BBC Three's then-current logo, dropping the logo that had been used for the last eight years. New idents were introduced, a range of live action and animated which consists of everyday situations in the modern era. The four-note signature jingle were introduced in similar way to ABC in the United States (which the original was in used from 1998 to 2021), albeit with some modifications.

Generic - Animated bright colours form the CBBC logo. Used for a variety of programming.
Bed - A boy with a headlamp reads a book on his duvet cover. Mainly used for serious programming and closedown.
Drone - A group of students walk to school with one bag being held by the drone. The logo is then formed by animated drones flying different segments of the logo in. Typically used for after-school programming.
Lights - A group of children move around glow sticks to form the logo. Used for entertainment programming.
Powder - A teenage boy jumps on a trampoline with powder of the different coloured logo segments flying around. A piece of stencil card is then held up to form the logo. Used for entertainment programming.
Slinky -  A group of children in a gym place coloured slinkies on the treadmills to make an infinite loop. The camera pans to show the formed logo. Typically used for factual and entertainment programming.
Window - A boy and a girl throw coloured plastic toy animals such as frogs and spiders on a window to form the logo. Usually used for comedy programming.
Igloo - Children create an igloo shaped like the logo. First used in December 2016 as the Christmas ident; it was later edited to be part of the set.

Colourful Lines

Following the BBC corporate rebrand in 2021, CBBC finally updated with the new logo on 15 March 2023. Much like BBC Two and BBC Three, the idents featured some colour lines, similar to the 2010 idents.

CBeebies

CBeebies was launched with the CBBC Channel on 11 February 2002, with an original age range of pre-school children only. Following changes within the BBC Children's department, this changed to ages up to 6, with CBBC targeting ages 6 to 12. The idents for the channel, designed by Lambie-Nairn, are the same as at launch and consist of yellow blobs (also known as the Bugbies), the opposite to the green blobs launched with the CBBC Channel with a much younger feel, as befits the target audience. In the last few weeks before CBeebies launched on the 11 February 2002, a CBeebies bug would occasionally appear on-screen briefly in either CBBC's 'Yellow' idents or in the presentation during the preschool programming, which teased young viewers that CBeebies was coming soon. The yellow blobs would bounce around gently to each other in a brightly coloured and patterned environment, with the CBeebies logo located in the centre top of the screen. The soundtrack was also gentle, with children's voices calling out the channel name, and the whole look was deliberately meant to be parallel, yet completely different from their sister channel, CBBC. In addition to these idents, some idents were created featuring the presenters bouncing the CBeebies logo around like a beach ball, and some which featured the blobs taking part in time related idents, such as sleeping on the moon in the Bedtime Hour, drinking milk at Lunchtime or riding a bike in Big Fun Time. Some idents are specific to strands of programmes, such as Discover and Do. CBeebies, like CBBC before it, make use of in-vision continuity links, however these are not presented by the CBeebies directors, but are recorded rather than broadcast live. The presenters make use of a large, colourful space with smooth lines and everyday objects, which is again appropriate to the age range.

Promotions originally featured a similar style as CBBC, with a patterned and coloured bar running across the bottom of the end of the promotion, featuring the title and CBeebies logo. This was changed in 2007 to three pattered hills overlapping each at the bottom of the screen. From 2009, the CBeebies logo and programme name would be contained within the center hill, with the left hill taken up by a yellow blob containing a clock with the time of the programme on, and the right occasionally containing details such as whether the programme was new. The channel also uses a DOG also known as the screen bugs (and has done since its launch), in the form of the yellow CBeebies logo, which rotates during the weekday segments at regular intervals to reveal a symbol for the segment; for example, the symbol for Discover and Do features a bug looking up at a rainbow. In the past, the channel has used different rotating DOGs including a dancing bug to promote Boogie Beebies. 

Following the BBC corporate rebrand in 2021, CBeebies finally updated with the new logo on 15 March 2023. The bugs are now updated with more blocky looking and the channel's signature jingle is reimagined for the new branding.

Christmas Themes
2002–2004 - Christmas Blobs
2005 - It's Magical
2006–2009 - Share the Magic
2010–2013 - Christmas Star
2014–2016 - Christmas Snowflake
2017–2018 - Pop-Up Winter Land
2019–2022 - Christmas Factory

See also

 History of BBC television idents

References

External links
 TVARK
 The Broom Cupboard
 BBC Archive - The Broom Cupboard - 25 years of live Children's BBC presentation 

BBC Television
BBC Idents
Children's television
Television presentation in the United Kingdom